The Lahti longwave transmitter was a facility for longwave transmission on the Radio Hill in Lahti, Finland on 252 kHz. It was inaugurated in 1927 and used a T-type aerial strung between two  freestanding steel framework towers. The Lahti longwave transmitter was shut down in 1993. Nowadays the facility is used as a museum. The red-and-white towers are still standing and form a local landmark. Nearby is lake Mytäjäinen.

See also
 List of towers

External links
 
http://www.skyscraperpage.com/diagrams/?b45639
http://www.skyscraperpage.com/diagrams/?b45640

Towers completed in 1927
Communication towers in Finland
Transmitter sites in Finland
Lahti
Museums in Päijät-Häme
1927 establishments in Finland